Jukdo is a small island adjacent to Ulleungdo, South Korea, in the Sea of Japan. It was formerly also known as Jukseodo in Korea and China and as Boussole Rock or Ou-san in Europe. In 2004, one family of three members was living on the island.

Outline 
Administratively, Jukdo belongs to Jeodong-ri, Ulleung township, Ulleung County, Gyeongsangbuk-do. The Hanja used to write this island is Jukseodo.

The Hanja for Jukdo or Jukseo mean "bamboo island/islet". Bamboo grasses grow in Jukdo, explaining the island's traditional name.

Position and satellite photo

Old Korean maps

See also
 Ulleungdo
 Usando
 Liancourt Rocks

Islands of North Gyeongsang Province
Islands of the Sea of Japan
Ulleung County